Art Zurich, also known as Art International Zurich and Contemporary Art Fair Zurich, is a public art fair in Zürich, Switzerland.
The fair showcases contemporary art styles, including painting, sculpture, photography, graphic, video and art objects. More than 1000 exhibitors from 70 countries have participated in the art fair established in 1999.

Since 1999, the art fair has so far counted more than 1000 exhibitors from over 70 countries. Since its inception, this art fair has enjoyed a steady upward trend, which can be attributed above all to the cosmopolitan mix of internationality and artistic diversity. The fair has thus developed into an institution in the Swiss art scene.

The fair is held Friday to Sunday in each early autumn. On Thursday before, the Vernissage evening is reserved for VIP guests. Depending upon availability, the public is allowed to participate, with an entry charge. Due to a renovation of Kongresshaus Zürich upon 2017, the fair will be held at Puls 5 in Zurich West. The new venue was very well received by the public. Alongside art cities New York and London, Zurich is one of the world's leading art trading cities and houses more than 100 galleries and over 50 museums.

References

Events in Zürich
Culture of Zürich
Tourist attractions in Zürich
1999 establishments in Switzerland
Autumn events in Switzerland